KNE could refer to:

 Communist Youth of Greece; Greek: Κομμουνιστική Νεολαία Ελλαδας, KNE.
 Kankanaey language; ISO 639-3 code KNE.
 Kennett railway station, England; National Rail station code KNE.
 Kishanganj railway station, Bihar, India; Indian Railways station code KNE.
 Knuckles the Echidna, a character from the Sonic the Hedgehog series.
 Kone Corporation; Helsinki Stock Exchange symbol KNE.